Y. Arpa is a Swiss watch designer. He started his career as a mathematics professor who, after participating in professional martial art combats in Thailand and crossing Papua New Guinea by foot, came back to his roots in Switzerland.

In 1997, he joined the Richemont Group for Baume & Mercier as the Managing Director for Switzerland and as 
Sales Director for Europe and Asia.

From 2002 to 2006 he acted as the Managing Director for Hublot participating in the launch of the Big Bang.

From 2006 to 2009 he was the CEO of Romain Jerome introducing watches with rusted steel from the Titanic or real moon dust.
 	
In 2009 Yvan Arpa created his own company called Luxury Artpieces for which he launched the brands below :

-Black Belt Watch is inspired by the seven virtues, the samurai code of conduct, associated with the Bushido warrior.
The brand proposes also a watch only for people who defends a black belt in Martial Arts.

-ArtyA : The brand is characterized by the unconventional raw materials it uses as butterfly wings, real bullets, fossilized dinosaur droppings, real spiders, boxes struck by lightning, tobacco leaves etc.

From 2010 to 2011, he acted as COO of Jacob&Co.

At Basel World 2013, he launched Spero Lucem, named in honor of his birth city Geneva.
For this brand, Yvan Arpa also created some pens and some knives.

At last, Yvan Arpa personalized a motorbike, which took more than 1'000 hours to sculpt and customize, with heavy artillery incrusted at the back, in the shape of a XXL shaped bullet belt.

In 2016, Yvan Arpa designed the smartwatch Gear S3 for Samsung, which is the first smartwatch using high-end watchmaking codes.
He also presents the Samsung Gear S3 in Berlin, at its International Launch Event.

According to hodinkee and due to his incredible life history "Yvan Arpa is a strong candidate to be the Most interesting Man in the World, Swiss Edition"

In 2017, Yvan Arpa joined Pascal Meyer, director of the website Qoqa. From their union, the watch Magma  was born, entirely “swiss made”  respecting the codes of fine watchmaking. 
Particularity: they possess a plate issued of 5 iconics watches from swiss watchmaking.

References 

Living people
Swiss chief executives
Chief operating officers
Year of birth missing (living people)